FindBugs is an open-source static code analyser created by Bill Pugh and David Hovemeyer which detects possible bugs in Java programs. Potential errors are classified in four ranks: (i) scariest, (ii) scary, (iii) troubling and (iv) of concern. This is a hint to the developer about their possible impact or severity. FindBugs operates on Java bytecode, rather than source code. The software is distributed as a stand-alone GUI application. There are also plug-ins available for Eclipse, NetBeans, IntelliJ IDEA, Gradle, Hudson, Maven, Bamboo and Jenkins.

Additional rule sets can be plugged in FindBugs to increase the set of checks performed.

See also
 List of tools for static code analysis

External links
 
 Manual
 List of bug patterns
 fb-contrib: additional bug detectors for FindBugs
 FindSecurityBugs: additional security-oriented bug detectors for FindBugs
 FindBugs-IDEA – The FindBugs Plugin for IntelliJ IDEA

SpotBugs

SpotBugs is the spiritual successor of FindBugs, carrying on from the point where it left off with support of its community.

In 2016, the project lead of FindBugs was inactive but there are many issues in its community so Andrey Loskutov gave an announcement  to its community, and some volunteers tried creating a project with support for modern Java platform and better maintainability. In 2017 Sep, Andrey Loskutov again gave an announcement  about the status of new community, then released SpotBugs 3.1.0  with support for Java 11 the new LTS, especially Java Platform Module System and invokedynamic instruction.

There are also plug-ins available for Eclipse, IntelliJ IDEA, Gradle, Maven  and SonarQube. SpotBugs also supports all of existing FindBugs plugins such as sb-contrib, find-security-bugs, with several minor changes.

External links

 SpotBugs Official Website
 SpotBugs Manual
 List of bug patterns

References

Static program analysis tools
Java development tools
Free software testing tools